Yevgeni Nikolayevich Lazarev (31 March 1937 – 18 November 2016), also credited as Eugene Lazarev, was a Russian–American actor and director. He was born in Minsk.

Biography 
He graduated from the Moscow Art Theatre School-Studio, and played in the Riga Russian Drama Theatre and Mayakovsky Theatre.

In the 1990s, he emigrated to the US, and later appeared in a number of Hollywood films, including The Saint, The Sum of All Fears, Lord of War, and Iron Man 2 (as Anton Vanko), as well as in TV series such as The West Wing (Episode: The Lame Duck Congress), Alias, and 24.

He was a professor at the Moscow Art Theatre Studio School and the Russian Academy of Theatre Arts, and was awarded the title of People's Artist of Russia. From 2003 to 2016, he had been teaching at the Stella Adler Studio of Acting of Los Angeles and the USC School of Cinematic Arts. He also voiced Imran Zakhaev in Activision's Call of Duty 4: Modern Warfare (2007). He died on November 18, 2016 at the age of 79.

Filmography 

Vasily Surikov (1959) as Surikov
Dlinnyy den (1961)
Silence (1963) as Arkady Uvarov
Tishina (1964)
Crime and Punishment (1970) as dr. Zosimov
Nezhdannyy gost (1972)
Seventeen Moments of Spring (1973, TV Mini-Series) as Emelyanov
The Road to Calvary (1975) as Prince Lobanov-Rostovsky
Gypsies Are Found Near Heaven (1976)
Po volchemu sledu (1977) as Grigoriy Kotovskiy
Bolshaya-malaya voyna (1980) as Kotovsky
Osobo vazhnoye zadaniye (1981)
Odnazhdy dvadtsat let spustya (1981)
Cherez Gobi i Khingan (1981)
Investigation Held by ZnaToKi (1981, TV Series) as Vladimir Tarasovich Vasykin
Private Life (1982) as Viktor Sergeyevich
Ottsy i dedy (1982)
U opasnoy cherty (1983)
Schastlivnik (1988)
Bez nadezhdy nadeyus (1989)
Futbolist (1990)
Vrag naroda - Bukharin (1991) as Vyshinskiy
Vstretimsya na Taiti (1991)
Uroki v kontse vesny (1991)
Klan (1991)
Stalin (1992, TV Movie) as Andrey Vyshinsky
Ice Runner (1993) as Nikolay Antonov
The Saint (1997) as President Karpov
Hamilton (1998) as Yuri Chivartsev
The West Wing (2000, TV Series) as Vassily Kononov
The Quickie (2001) as Uncle Anatoly 
Alias (2001, TV Series) as dr. Kreshnik
24 (2002, TV Series) as Nikola Luminovic
The Sum of All Fears (2002) as General Dubinin
ER (2002, TV Series) as Ivo Guter
Duplex (2003) as Mr. Dzerzhinsky
Pearl Diver (2004) as Issac Epp
Malachance (2004) as Mr. Karmin
The Turkish Gambit (2005) as Alexander II of Russia
Lord of War (2005) as General Dmitri Volkov
The Unit (2006, TV Series) as Russian Ambassador
Call of Duty 4: Modern Warfare (2007) as Imran Zakhaev
The Nine (2006, TV Series) as Mr. Lushtak
The Onion Movie (2008) as Slovesevic 
The Pink Panther 2 (2009) as Pope
Driven to Kill (2009) as bartender
Iron Man 2 (2010) as Anton Vanko (final film role)

Awards
 Honored Artist of the RSFSR (1973)
 People's Artist of the RSFSR (1982)
 Order of Friendship of Peoples
 Order of Honour (1998)
 Moscow Prize

References

External links 
 
 Yevgeni Lazarev —  kinoteatr.ru
 Yevgeni Lazarev —  kinopoisk.ru
 Персональная страница на сайте USC School of Cinematic Arts

1937 births
2016 deaths
Actors from Minsk
Soviet male actors
Russian male actors
American male film actors
American male television actors
Soviet emigrants to the United States
Russian emigrants to the United States
Soviet theatre directors
Russian drama teachers
Recipients of the Order of Honour (Russia)
Recipients of the Order of Friendship of Peoples
People's Artists of the RSFSR
Honored Artists of the RSFSR
Moscow Art Theatre School alumni
Academic staff of Moscow Art Theatre School